"Read About It" is a song by Australian rock band Midnight Oil, released as the third and final single from their 1982 studio album, 10, 9, 8, 7, 6, 5, 4, 3, 2, 1. It was a favourite with the band and with fans, appearing at least once on every tour since its release and appearing at the WaveAid concert. Very few other Midnight Oil songs have appeared so often (only "Power and the Passion", "Beds Are Burning", "The Dead Heart", and "Say Your Prayers" are known to have been performed so often).

At the 1984 Countdown Music Awards, the group were nominated for Best Group Performance in a Video for their work in this work.

Song structure and meaning
The abrasive "Read About It" has a repeatedly staggered time signature, shifting between 7/4, 4/4, and 6/4.

The song targets Rupert Murdoch in particular and Australian media in general. On the Blackfella/Whitefella Tour, Peter Garrett referred to the song as the 'Rupert Murdoch Alligator Express'.

Track listing
 "Read About It" (Rob Hirst, Jim Moginie, Peter Garrett, Martin Rotsey, Peter Gifford) – 3:51
 "Outside World" (Hirst, Moginie, Garrett, Rotsey, Gifford) – 4:22

Compilations
The song's original studio version was featured on Flat Chat.

References

Midnight Oil songs
1982 singles
Columbia Records singles
Song recordings produced by Nick Launay
1982 songs
Songs about the media
Songs written by Rob Hirst
Songs written by Jim Moginie
Songs written by Peter Garrett
Songs written by Martin Rotsey